Renicolidae is a family of trematodes belonging to the order Plagiorchiida.

Genera:
 Nephromonorcha Leonov, 1958
 Renicola Cohn, 1904

References

Plagiorchiida